Events in the year 2021 in Latvia.

Incumbents 
President: Egils Levits
Prime Minister: Arturs Krišjānis Kariņš

Events 
Ongoing — COVID-19 pandemic in Latvia

January 
1 January:
tax changes:
the national minimum wage was officially raised from €430 to €500 a month.
the personal income tax-free minimum (PIT) has been increased from €250 to €300 per month.
the non-taxable minimum for pensioners with PIT was increased to €330 per month instead of the current €300.
the income threshold to which the differentiated PIT non-taxable minimum applies was increased from 1,200 to 1,800 euros per month.
the rate of compulsory state social insurance contributions (SSIAI) was reduced by 1%. Namely, from the previous 35.09% to 34.09% - by 0.5% for both employers and employees.
the solidarity tax rate was reduced by 0.5% from 25.5% to 25%.
Public Broadcasting of Latvia left the advertising market thanks to state funding.
7 January:
 Ilze Viņķele was relieved of his duties as Minister of Health, and Minister of Defense Artis Pabriks was appointed Acting Minister.
 The Saeima approved Daniels Pavļuts as the Minister of Health.
 The National Alliance submits to the Saeima a draft law regarding an amendment to the Constitution, which intends to strictly define the concept of family as a union of a male and a female person.

April 
28 April – Riga hostel fire

June 
5 June – 2021 Latvian municipal elections was held.

Deaths 
 
 
27 February – Alvils Gulbis, basketball player (born 1936).
14 March – Māris Grīnblats, politician, minister of Education (born 1955).
24 March – Uldis Bērziņš, poet and translator (born 1944).
27 June – Jevgeņijs Drobots, politician and engineer (born 1946).
4 July – Matīss Kivlenieks, professional ice hockey goaltender (born 1996).
July 18 – Valerij Zhuravliov, Soviet/Latvian chess master (born 1938).
14 September – Ansis Bērziņš, film producer and director (born 1940).
14 October – Ojārs Ēriks Kalniņš, politician and diplomat (born 1949).
5 November – Andris Kolbergs, writer (born 1938).

References 

 
2020s in Latvia
Years of the 21st century in Latvia
Latvia
Latvia